KLIN (1400 AM) is a radio station broadcasting a news talk information format. Licensed to Lincoln, Nebraska, United States, the station serves the Lincoln area. The station is currently owned by NRG Media and features programming from Compass Media Networks, Premiere Networks, Westwood One, NBC News Radio, and Fox News Radio. KLIN's studios are located at Broadcast House at 44th Street and East O Street in Lincoln, while its transmitter site is located near Salt Creek and Cornhusker Highway in the northern part of the city.

KLIN had its antecedents in Fremont, Nebraska, where the AM station on 1400 kHz was originally authorized in 1940, with the call letters KORN. The station was sold to Inland Broadcasting in 1947. In connection with the acquisition, the FCC authorized Inland to relocate the station to Lincoln and change the call sign to KOLN, and also to build a new station on 1340 kHz at Fremont, to become KORN. KOLN began broadcasting August 11, 1947, as a Mutual affiliate on 1400 kHz with 250 Watts of power. Studios were in the New Federal Securities Building in Lincoln.

In February 1953, station owner Cornhusker Radio and Television Corporation established KOLN's companion television station KOLN-TV. Broadcasting pioneer John Fetzer purchased the stations in August 1953. Fetzer sold KOLN radio in 1955, in order to devote all his energies to TV. KOLN radio changed its call sign to KLIN on June 1, 1955, and the station moved to offices and studios in the Sharp Building in downtown Lincoln.

Fletcher-Mitchell Corp., acquired KLIN in December 1956. It was a Nebraska corporation owned by Jonathan M. Fletcher and James I. Mitchell. In May 1963, Mitchell acquired 100% ownership. That year, KLIN relocated to 13th and L Streets.

In April 1965, KLIN was sold to Shurtleff-Schorr Broadcasting Corp., a Nebraska corporation owned by Donald O. Shurtleff and Paul C. Schorr. That summer, a minority interest in the company was acquired by station manager Jack L. Callaway.

In the fall of 1971, KLIN, Inc., a Nebraska corporation owned by Norton Warner, acquired the station license. KLIN moved into its present offices and studios at Broadcast House in the fall of 1976.

In May 2000, KLIN was acquired by a licensee entity of Triad Broadcasting.

In August 2007, Triad sold the station to NRG Media.

On May 3, 2012, KLIN began simulcasting on FM translator K233AN 94.5 FM.  The simulcast lasted until August 26, 2014, when K233AN switched to a simulcast of co-owned FM Station KBBK's HD2 subchannel, RED 94.5. KLIN now simulcasts in high definition on KBBK's HD3 subchannel. In late 2017, KLIN was granted an FM translator to rebroadcast its signal on 99.3 FM (K257GN) The translator signed on in June 2021.

KLIN is the flagship station of Nebraska Cornhuskers football, men's basketball and baseball.  In 2014, KLIN became an affiliate for the Denver Broncos Radio Network.  KLIN has previously held NFL affiliations with the Detroit Lions and the Washington Redskins.

References

External links
FCC History Cards for KLIN

LIN
NRG Media radio stations